Chahar Taq-e Bala (also Romanized as Chahār Ţāq-e Bālā) is a village in Kohanabad Rural District, Kohanabad District, Aradan County, Semnan Province, Iran. At the 2006 census, its population was 110, in 36 families.

References 

Populated places in Aradan County